Mark Segebart (born August 1950) is the Iowa State Senator from the 6th District. A Republican, he has served in the Iowa Senate since winning election in 2012. Segebart spent 16 years as a Crawford County Supervisor before running for state Senate.

As of February 2020, Segebart served on the following committees:  Human Resources (Vice Chair), Local Government, and Natural Resources and Environment. He also served on the Health Policy Oversight Committee as well as the Child Care Advisory Committee, and the Commission on Aging.

In July 2020, Segabart announced that he would be retiring from the State Senate at the end of his term in January 2021.

Electoral history

Personal 
He currently resides in Vail, Iowa with his wife Catherine. The two have been advocates for children their entire lives, with Mark previously serving as a bus driver and Catherine serving as a teacher. They have two children and two grandchildren.

References 

Republican Party Iowa state senators
Iowa State University alumni
People from Crawford County, Iowa
1950 births
Living people
21st-century American politicians